Lauriston Reservoir is a reservoir in Victoria, Australia, with a maximum capacity of 19,800 megalitres. The dam that created it, located 9 km west of Kyneton along Lauriston Reservoir Road, was constructed from 1938 to 1941 and has a spillway that measures 77 metres. The site is a popular picnic ground as one can fish there (although not from the dam structure itself), and barbecue facilities are available. The reservoir is known to contain redfin perch, rainbow and brown trout, roach and cod.

The picnic and BBQ area near the dam wall at the end of Lauriston Reservoir Road are now free.

References

External links
 Water Resources:Lauriston, owned by Coliban Water
 Lauriston Reservoir (Storage Capacity (ML): 19790 ML) DEPI - Water storages

Reservoirs in Victoria (Australia)
North-Central catchment
Rivers of Loddon Mallee (region)